The Elmira Heights Village Hall, located in Elmira Heights, New York, was built in 1896. It was designed by local architects Pierce & Bickford. It is significant architecturally as an example of the Chateauesque or Northern Renaissance Revival style of the period. It is significant historically for its role in local government. The building was added to the National Register of Historic Places in 1982.

References

City and town halls on the National Register of Historic Places in New York (state)
Government buildings completed in 1896
Buildings and structures in Chemung County, New York
Village halls in the United States
National Register of Historic Places in Chemung County, New York